"East 1999" is Bone Thugs-n-Harmony's second single released in 1995 from their album E. 1999 Eternal. This is one of five songs on the album to feature member Flesh-n-Bone who wasn't signed to Ruthless with the rest of the group.

Official version
"East 1999" (LP Version) (4:21)
"East 1999" (U-Neek's Last Dayz Remix) (4:26)
"Buddah Lovaz" (LP Version) (5:43)
Verse 1 - Layzie Bone
Verse 2 - Krayzie Bone
Verse 3 - Bizzy Bone
Verse 4 - Flesh-n-Bone
Verse 5 - Wish Bone

Import version
"East 1999" (Album Version) (4:21)
"East 1999" (U-Neek's Last Dayz Remix) (4:26)
"East 1999" (U-Neek's Last Dayz Remix (A Capella))
"Buddah Lovaz" (4:43)
"1st of tha Month" (DJ Premier Mix) (5:07)
"1st of tha Month" (The Kruder & Dorfmeister Session - Part 1) (6:12)
"1st of tha Month" (The Kruder & Dorfmeister Session - Part 3) (6:20)

Charts

"East 1999" charted weekly on Billboard's Hot Rap Songs from December 9, 1995, to March 23, 1996. It was then absent from the charts for three weeks before re-entering the chart for a further two weeks bringing "East 1999"'s chart-week tally to 18. A website was built in honor of the song and music put out by bone, East1999.com.

Personnel

Official version
Produced by: DJ U-Neek for U-Neek Entertainment, Inc
Executive produced by: Eazy-E
Co-produced by: Tony C
Published by: Mo' Thug Muzic (ASCAP), Keenu Songs (BMI), Don Khris Music (BMI)

Import version
Remix and additional production by: Peter Kruder and Richard Dorfmeister (tracks 6 & 7)
Published by: Ruthless Attack Muzick, Mo' Thug Muzic, Dollarz N Sense Muzick, Keenu Songs, Donkhris Music

References

External links
Bone Thugs-n-Harmony official website
Ruthless Records official website

1995 singles
1995 songs
Bone Thugs-n-Harmony songs
Gangsta rap songs
Horrorcore songs
Ruthless Records singles
Songs written by Flesh-n-Bone
Songs written by Layzie Bone
Songs written by Bizzy Bone
Songs written by Wish Bone
Songs written by Krayzie Bone
Songs written by DJ U-Neek